The ThinkPad P series line of laptops is produced by Lenovo and was introduced by the company as a successor to the previous ThinkPad W series. With 15.6" and 17.3" screens, the ThinkPad P series saw the reintroduction of physically large laptops into the ThinkPad line. Marketed largely as portable workstations, many P series laptops can be configured with high-end quad-core, hexa-core or octo-core Intel processors as well as ECC memory (only with Xeon Processors) and a discrete Nvidia Quadro GPU. The P series offers ISV certifications from software vendors such as Adobe and Autodesk for various CAD software. The P52 and P72 models are the last current Lenovo laptops with a dedicated magnesium structural frame.

All 15" and 17" models have a standard 6-row ThinkPad Precision Keyboard (with Numeric Keypad and optional backlight), TrackPoint and touchpad, and optional fingerprint reader. The HQ processor-based models (such as a P50/P70 and above) use only 170 W AC power adapters, or optional 230 W adapters for the larger 17" configurations.

Models

First Generation 

The first generation comes with a variety of "high-end" options such as Intel Xeon processors, 4K IPS screens and DDR4 RAM up to 64 GB. 1080p screens and Intel Core Series CPUs come standard along with PCIe SSDs. The P Series introduced a cooling system known as FLEX that features two fans connected by a heat pipe and located near the CPU and GPU. A three-button touchpad is included.

P40 Yoga 
P40 Yoga is a version of the ThinkPad Yoga 460 with Nvidia Quadro graphics.

P50s 
ThinkPad P50s is an update of ThinkPad W550s, focused on mobility. Its chassis is based on that of the T560.

P50 
The ThinkPad P50, while having a 15-inch display, shared little in design with the W541 which it replaced. Its ports had been re-arranged, it was slightly thinner than its predecessor, and it reintroduced indicator lights for hard drive activity. It supports up to three internal storage devices and has a single USB Type-C Thunderbolt 3 port while also featuring Mini DisplayPort and HDMI connections. Weighing 2.5 kilograms and having thickness of 2.6 centimeters, the P50 was lighter than previous W series laptops.

P70 
The ThinkPad P70 is the successor to the W701. It has a 17-inch display, weighs 3.4 kilograms and is 3.1 centimeters thick. It supports up to four internal storage devices and includes two USB Type-C Thunderbolt 3 ports.

Second Generation

P51 
A minor update to the P50, which included the updated CM238 chipset.

P51s 
The P51s chassis was based on the T570 chassis. The CPU and integrated chipset was updated to Kaby Lake-U.

P71 
A minor update to the P70, including the updated CM238 chipset.

Third generation

P1 
The ThinkPad P1 was based on the first generation of ThinkPad X1 Extreme. It features Intel Xeon CPUs and Nvidia Quadro graphics.

P52 
The P52 was a redesign of the P51, which introduced Coffee Lake CPUs, all with 6 cores and 12 threads, the CM246 chipset, and Nvidia Pascal GPUs. It removed the mechanical docking port and ExpressCard slot, and features a narrower keyboard which is present on other ThinkPads, and an integrated battery.

P52s 
Based on the ThinkPad T580, the P52s features a camera shutter, lateral instead of bottom-mounted docking port, and 8th Gen Core i5/i7 low power CPUs. The P52s includes quad-core Kaby Lake-R 15W CPUs and Nvidia Quadro P500 GPUs.

P72 
The P72 was a redesign of the P71, with features similar to those of the P52. It also features the narrower keyboard of the P52, an integrated battery, and is the first 17" ThinkPad with a soldered GPU.

Fourth generation

P1 Gen2 
The P1 Gen2 was an update to the P1 which features Intel 9th Gen Coffee Lake Refresh Core i5/i7/i9 and Xeon E mobile Processors and Nvidia Quadro T series GPUs.

P43s 
The ThinkPad P43s has a new 14 Inch design. It features Intel 8th Gen Coffee Lake U-Series Processors and Nvidia Quadro P Series graphics.

P53 
Based on the ThinkPad P52, the P53 features a 4K UHD OLED Touch display, WiFi 6, Intel 9th Gen Coffee Lake Refresh Core i5/i7/i9 and Xeon E mobile Processors and Nvidia Quadro RTX Turing GPUs.

P53s 
The P53s is an update to the P52s, which features Intel 8th Gen Coffee Lake U-Series Processors, Nvidia Quadro P520 Graphics and up to 4k UHD (3840 x 2160) display, available with Dolby Vision high dynamic range (HDR) technology.

P73 
The P73 was a redesign of the P72, with hardware upgrades similar to those of the P53. The P73 features new Intel 9th Gen Coffee Lake Refresh CPUs and Nvidia Quadro RTX Turing GPUs.

Fifth generation

P1 Gen3 

Features NVidia graphics and OLED screen.

P14s

P15 Gen1

P15s

P15v

P17 Gen1

Sixth generation

P1 Gen4 

The OLED screen option was removed.

P14s Gen2 
The second generation P14s is just an iterative update of the previous model with new AMD Ryzen 5xxx series and Intel 11th gen CPUs. The main difference between the Intel and AMD version is the Thunderbolt with USB 3.1 Gen 1 capabilities of the USB-C ports, which (including the USB-A) are USB 3.2 Gen 2 (no TB) on the AMD model, but also support DisplayPort alternate mode. The AMD and Intel model now also offer the same display panel options, while the aluminium case option is still exclusive to the Intel variant.

P15 Gen2

P15s Gen2

P17 Gen2

Seventh generation

P1 Gen5 

Features NFC, liquid metal thermal paste, and 16:10 IPS screen options.

Notes

References

External links
Lenovo page

Lenovo laptops
P series
Computer-related introductions in 2015
Mobile workstations